Ernest Kruskopf (3 February 1919 – 20 January 1981) was a New Zealand cricketer. He played two first-class matches for Otago in 1944/45.

See also
 List of Otago representative cricketers

References

External links
 

1919 births
1981 deaths
New Zealand cricketers
Otago cricketers
Cricketers from Dunedin